Ghaleb Rida or Ghaleb Reda;  (born July 10, 1981 in Nabatieh, Lebanon) is a professional Lebanese basketball player for sagesse Club and a member of  Lebanon national basketball team as a shooting guard.

His former clubs included Sporting Al Riyadi Beirut, Champville SC, Tebnin SC, Sagesse and Anibal Zahle.

When young he was monitored by many scouts, he was approached by the San Antonio Spurs.

References

Living people
Lebanese men's basketball players
People from Nabatieh
1981 births
Shooting guards
2010 FIBA World Championship players
Sagesse SC basketball players
Al Riyadi Club Beirut basketball players